Mar Shimun may refer to any of the following Patriarchs of the Church of the East:

 Shemon Bar Sabbae, (c. 329–c. 341), Church of the East
 Shimun II (1365–1392), Church of the East
 Shimun III (1403–1407), Church of the East
 Shimun IV (1437–1497), Church of the East
 Shimun V (1497–1501), Church of the East
 Shimun VI (1503–1538), Church of the East
 Shemon VII Ishoyahb (1538–1551), Church of the East
 Shimun VIII Yohannan Sulaqa (1553–1555), first Patriarch of the Chaldean Catholic Church
 Shimun IX Dinkha (1580–1600), Patriarch of the Chaldean Catholic Church
 Shimun X Eliyah (1600–1638)
 Shimun XI Eshuyow (1638–1656)
 Shimun XII Yoalaha (1656–1662)
 Shimun XIII Dinkha (1662) 1681–1700, Patriarch who broke the Communion with Rome.  Successors became leaders of the Assyrian Church of the East
 Shimun XIV Shlemon (1700–1740), Assyrian Church of the East
 Shimun XV Maqdassi Mikhail (1740–1780), Assyrian Church of the East
 Shimun XVI Yohannan (1780–1820), Assyrian Church of the East
 Shimun XVII Abraham (1820–1860), Assyrian Church of the East
 Shimun XVIII Rubil (1860–1903), Assyrian Church of the East
 Shimun XIX Benyamin (1903–1918), Assyrian Church of the East
 Shimun XX Paulos (1918–1920), Assyrian Church of the East
 Shimun XXI Eshai (1920–1975) (assassinated), Assyrian Church of the East

See also
 List of patriarchs of the Church of the East
 List of Chaldean Catholic Patriarchs of Babylon